Deputy Ministers in Tanzania assist the Ministers in running their respective portfolios.

See also
 Cabinet of Tanzania

References